was mayor of Hiroshima from 1939 to 1943.

He survived the atomic attack on Hiroshima on August 6, 1945, and continued working for the Hiroshima municipality until 1947, when the US authorities purged him from his duties. In January 1946, he was appointed as chairman of the special Restoration Bureau established by the mayor Shichirō Kihara. After losing the right to work, he supported the policies of mayor Shinzo Hamai in reconstruction.

He died of stomach cancer.

Notes

References
 Shinzo Hamai, A-Bomb Mayor: Warnings and Hope from Hiroshima (Hiroshima, 2010)

1876 births
1951 deaths
Mayors of Hiroshima
Members of the House of Representatives (Japan)
Deaths from cancer in Japan
Deaths from stomach cancer